Pushnino is a rural locality (a village) in Bereznikovskoye Rural Settlement, Sobinsky District, Vladimir Oblast, Russia. The population was 14 as of 2010.

Geography 
The village is located 10 km south-west from Berezniki, 28 km south from Sobinka.

References 

Rural localities in Sobinsky District